The 2021 Tampa Bay Rays season was the 24th season of the Tampa Bay Rays franchise and their 14th as the Rays. The Rays played their home games at Tropicana Field as members of Major League Baseball's American League East Division.

The Rays finished with a 100–62 record, winning the American League East division title for the second consecutive season. It was the first time in franchise history the Rays repeated as division champions, and the first time in franchise history the Rays won 100 games. Manager Kevin Cash was named the American League Manager of the Year. However, they were upset in the Division Series, losing in 4 games to the Boston Red Sox.

Season standings

American League East

American League Wild Card

Rays team leaders

Updated through game of September 9.

 Minimum 3.1 plate appearances per team games played
AVG qualified batters: Arozarena, Díaz, Lowe, Meadows

 Minimum 1 inning pitched per team games played
ERA & WHIP qualified pitchers: None

Record against opponents

Game log

Regular season
The 2021 regular season schedule was announced on July 9, 2020.

|-style="background:#bfb;"
| 1 || April 1 || @ Marlins || 1–0 || Thompson (1–0) || García (0–1) || Castillo (1) || 7,062 || 1–0 || W1
|-style="background:#bfb;"
| 2 || April 2 || @ Marlins || 6–4 || Kittredge (1–0) || Bass (0–1) || Castillo (2) || 6,115 || 2–0 || W2
|-style="background:#fbb;"
| 3 || April 3 || @ Marlins || 7–12 || Bleier (1–0) || Archer (0–1) || — || 6,179 || 2–1 || L1
|-style="background:#fbb;"
| 4 || April 5 || @ Red Sox || 2–11 || Pivetta (1–0) || Wacha (0–1) || — || 4,577 || 2–2 || L2
|-style="background:#fbb;"
| 5 || April 6 || @ Red Sox || 5–6  || Valdéz (1–0) || Thompson (1–1) || — || 4,682 || 2–3 || L3
|-style="background:#fbb;"
| 6 || April 7 || @ Red Sox || 2–9 || Eovaldi (1–1) || Yarbrough (0–1) || — || 4,751 || 2–4 || L4
|-style="background:#bfb;"
| 7 || April 9 || Yankees || 10–5 || Hill (1–0) || Kluber (0–1) || — || 9,021 || 3–4 || W1
|-style="background:#bfb;"
| 8 || April 10 || Yankees || 4–0 || Kittredge (2–0) || Germán (0–2) || — || 6,270 || 4–4 || W2
|-style="background:#fbb;"
| 9 || April 11 || Yankees || 4–8  || Chapman (1–0) || McHugh (0–1) || — || 6,965 || 4–5 || L1
|-style="background:#bfb;"
| 10 || April 12 || Rangers || 1–0 || Glasnow (1–0) || Hearn (0–1) || Castillo (3) || 3,627 || 5–5 || W1
|-style="background:#fbb;"
| 11 || April 13 || Rangers || 3–8 || Gibson (2–0) || Yarbrough (0–2) || — || 4,753 || 5–6 || L1
|-style="background:#fbb;"
| 12 ||April 14 || Rangers || 1–5 || Arihara (1–1) || Fleming (0–1) || — || 3,021 || 5–7 || L2
|-style="background:#fbb;"
| 13 || April 15 || Rangers || 4–6  || Sborz (1–0) || Reed (0–1) || Kennedy (3) || 4,217 || 5–8 || L3
|-style="background:#bfb;"
| 14 || April 16 || @ Yankees || 8–2 || Wacha (1–1) || Nelson (0–2) || — || 10,202 || 6–8 || W1
|-style="background:#bfb;"
| 15 || April 17 || @ Yankees || 6–3 || Glasnow (2–0) || Montgomery (1–1) || Castillo (4) || 10,583 || 7–8 || W2
|-style="background:#bfb;"
| 16 || April 18 || @ Yankees || 4–2 || Yarbrough (1–2) || Cole (2–1) || Springs (1) || 10,606 || 8–8 || W3
|-style="background:#bfb;"
| 17 || April 19 || @ Royals || 4–1 || Fleming (1–1) || Duffy (2–1) || — || 5,589 || 9–8 || W4
|-style="background:#bfb;"
| 18 || April 20 || @ Royals || 14–7 || Kittredge (3–0) || Keller (1–2) || Richards (1) || 4,481 || 10–8 || W5
|-style="background:#fbb;"
| 19 || April 21 || @ Royals || 8–9 || Barlow (1–0) || Castillo (0–1) || — || 5,053 || 10–9 || L1
|-style="background:#fbb;"
| 20 || April 23 || Blue Jays || 3–5 || Matz (4–0) || Glasnow (2–1) || Dolis (1) || 5,564 || 10–10 || L2
|-style="background:#bfb;"
| 21 || April 24 || Blue Jays || 5–3 || Thompson (2–1) || Romano (1–1) || Kittredge (1) || 6,688 || 11–10 || W1
|-style="background:#fbb;"
| 22 || April 25 || Blue Jays || 0–1 || Mayza (1–0) || Fleming (1–2) || Dolis (2) || 6,372 || 11–11 || L1
|-style="background:#fbb;"
| 23 || April 26 || Athletics || 1–2 || Manaea (3–1) || Hill (1–1) || Trivino (3) || 2,981 || 11–12 || L2
|-style="background:#bfb;"
| 24 || April 27 || Athletics || 4–3 || Springs (1–0) || Montas (2–2) || Castillo (5) || 2,924 || 12–12 || W1
|-style="background:#bfb;"
| 25 || April 28 || Athletics || 2–0 || Glasnow (3–1) || Irvin (2–3) || Castillo (6) || 3,374 || 13–12 || W2
|-style="background:#fbb;"
| 26 || April 29 || Athletics || 2–3 || Diekman (1–0) || Castillo (0–2) || Trivino (4) || 3,737 || 13–13 || L1
|-style="background:#fbb;"
| 27 || April 30 || Astros || 2–9 || McCullers Jr. (2–1) || Yarbrough (1–3) || — || 6,169 || 13–14 || L2
|-

|-style="background:#fbb;"
| 28 || May 1 || Astros || 1–3 || Urquidy (2–2) || Fleming (1–3) || Pressly (4) || 7,335 || 13–15 || L3
|-style="background:#bfb;"
| 29 || May 2 || Astros || 5–4 || Springs (2–0) || Raley (0–1) || Castillo (7) || 6,933 || 14–15 || W1
|-style="background:#bfb;"
| 30 || May 3 || @ Angels || 7–3 || Glasnow (4–1) || Quintana (0–3) || — || 10,641 || 15–15 || W2
|-style="background:#bfb;"
| 31 || May 4 || @ Angels || 8–3 || Patiño (1–0) || Cobb (1–2) || — || 8,152 || 16–15 || W3
|-style="background:#bfb;"
| 32 || May 5 || @ Angels || 3–1 || Yarbrough (2–3) || Guerra (2–1) || Springs (2) || 9,169 || 17–15 || W4
|-style="background:#bfb;"
| 33 || May 6 || @ Angels || 8–3 || Fleming (2–3) || Mayers (1–2) || — || 8,840 || 18–15 || W5
|-style="background:#fbb;"
| 34 || May 7 || @ Athletics || 1–2 || Diekman (2–0) || Springs (2–1) || — || 5,058 || 18–16 || L1
|-style="background:#fbb;"
| 35 || May 8 || @ Athletics || 3–6 || Montas (4–2) || Glasnow (4–2) || Trivino (6) || 7,707 || 18–17 || L2
|-style="background:#bfb;"
| 36 || May 9 || @ Athletics || 4–3 || Springs (3–1) || Irvin (3–4) || Kittredge (2) || 6,911 || 19–17 || W1
|-style="background:#fbb;"
| 37 || May 11 || Yankees || 1–3 || Montgomery (2–1) || Patiño (1–1) || Chapman (8) || 5,441 || 19–18 || L1
|-style="background:#fbb;"
| 38 || May 12 || Yankees || 0–1 || Cole (5–1) || Thompson (2–2) || Chapman (9) || 5,668 || 19–19 || L2
|-style="background:#bfb;"
| 39 || May 13 || Yankees || 9–1 || Hill (2–1) || Taillon (1–3) || — || 6,229 || 20–19 || W1
|-style="background:#bfb;"
| 40 || May 14 || Mets || 3–2 || Fairbanks (1–0) || Castro (0–1) || — || 7,123 || 21–19 || W2
|-style="background:#bfb;"
| 41 || May 15 || Mets || 12–5 || McClanahan (1–0) || Lucchesi (1–3) || — || 7,536 || 22–19 || W3
|-style="background:#bfb;"
| 42 || May 16 || Mets || 7–1 || Fleming (3–3) || Stroman (3–4) || — || 7,355 || 23–19 || W4
|-style="background:#bfb;"
| 43 || May 18 || @ Orioles || 13–6 || Kittredge (4–0) || Harvey (3–4) || — || 5,429 || 24–19 || W5
|-style="background:#bfb;"
| 44 || May 19 || @ Orioles || 9–7 || Thompson (3–2)  || Fry (0–1) || Fairbanks (1) || 6,581 || 25–19 || W6
|-style="background:#bfb;"
| 45 || May 20 || @ Orioles || 10–1 || Hill (3–1) || Kremer (0–4) || — || 6,916 || 26–19 || W7
|-style="background:#bfb;"
| 46 || May 21 || @ Blue Jays || 9–7  || Castillo (1–2) || Beasley (0–1) || — || 1,437 || 27–19 || W8
|-style="background:#bfb;"
| 47 || May 22 || @ Blue Jays || 3–1 || Kittredge (5–0) || Castro (0–1) || Castillo (8) || 1,514 || 28–19 || W9
|-style="background:#bfb;"
| 48 || May 23 || @ Blue Jays || 6–4 || Fleming (4–3) || Chatwood (0–1) || Feyereisen (1) || 1,496 || 29–19 || W10
|-style="background:#bfb;"
| 49 || May 24 || @ Blue Jays || 14–8  || Springs (4–1) || Payamps (0–2) || — || 1,641 || 30–19 || W11
|-style="background:#fbb;"
| 50 || May 25 || Royals || 1–2 || Keller (4–4) || Hill (3–2) || Zimmer (2) || 4,946 || 30–20 || L1
|-style="background:#bfb;"
| 51 || May 26 || Royals || 2–1  || Feyereisen (1–2) || Zuber (0–2) || — || 4,973 || 31–20 || W1
|-style="background:#bfb;"
| 52 || May 27 || Royals || 7–2 || McClanahan (2–0) || Singer (2–4) || — || 5,519 || 32–20 || W2
|-style="background:#bfb;"
| 53 || May 29 || Phillies || 5–3 || Castillo (2–2) || Coonrod (0–2) || Feyereisen (2) || 7,316 || 33–20 || W3
|-style="background:#bfb;"
| 54 || May 30 || Phillies || 6–2 || Fleming (5–3) || Eflin (2–5) || — || 7,479 || 34–20 || W4
|-style="background:#bfb;"
| 55 || May 31 || @ Yankees || 3–1 || Hill (4–2) || Taillon (1–4) || Feyereisen (3) || 17,008 || 35–20 || W5
|-

|-style="background:#fbb;"
| 56 || June 1 || @ Yankees || 3–5  || Cessa (1–0) || Kittredge (5–1) || — || 12,537 || 35–21 || L1
|-style="background:#fbb;"
| 57 || June 2 || @ Yankees || 3–4 || Montgomery (3–1) || McClanahan (2–1) || Chapman (12) || 13,824 || 35–22 || L2
|-style="background:#bfb;"
| 58 || June 3 || @ Yankees || 9–2 || Yarbrough (3–3) || Cole (6–3) || — || 12,614 || 36–22 || W1
|-style="background:#fbb;"
| 59 || June 4 || @ Rangers || 4–5 || Gibson (4–0) || Fleming (5–4) || Kennedy (12) || 30,635 || 36–23 || L1
|-style="background:#bfb;"
| 60 || June 5 || @ Rangers || 3–0 || Hill (5–2) || Allard (1–2) || Castillo (9) || 27,237 || 37–23 || W1
|-style="background:#bfb;"
| 61 || June 6 || @ Rangers || 7–1 || Feyereisen (2–2) || King (5–4) || — || 26,442 || 38–23 || W2
|-style="background:#bfb;"
| 62 || June 8 || Nationals || 3–1 || Glasnow (5–2) || Suero (0–1) || Castillo (10) || 7,173 || 39–23 || W3
|-style="background:#fbb;"
| 63 || June 9 || Nationals || 7–9  || Hand (3–2) || Castillo (2–3) || Rainey (1) || 7,616 || 39–24 || L1
|-style="background:#bfb;"
| 64 || June 11 || Orioles || 4–2 || Yarbrough (4–3) || Akin (0–1) || Fairbanks (2) || 6,211 || 40–24 || W1
|-style="background:#bfb;"
| 65 || June 12 || Orioles || 5–4 || McHugh (1–1) || López (2–7) || Castillo (11) || 9,225 || 41–24 || W2
|-style="background:#bfb;"
| 66 || June 13 || Orioles || 7–1 || Fleming (6–4) || Zimmermann (4–4) || — || 9,101 || 42–24 || W3
|-style="background:#bfb;"
| 67 || June 14 || @ White Sox || 5–2 || Feyereisen (3–2) || Lynn (7–2) || Fairbanks (3) || 18,024 || 43–24 || W4
|-style="background:#fbb;"
| 68 || June 15 || @ White Sox || 0–3 || Keuchel (6–1) || McClanahan (2–2) || Hendriks (18) || 19,259 || 43–25 || L1
|-style="background:#fbb;"
| 69 || June 16 || @ White Sox || 7–8  || Burr (1–0) || Fairbanks (1–1) || — || 20,098 || 43–26 || L2
|-style="background:#fbb;"
| 70 || June 17 || @ Mariners || 5–6 || Santiago (1–1) || Fairbanks (1–2) || — || 9,092 || 43–27 || L3
|-style="background:#fbb;"
| 71 || June 18 || @ Mariners || 1–5 || Kikuchi (4–3) || Wacha (1–2) || — || 12,654 || 43–28 || L4
|-style="background:#fbb;"
| 72 || June 19 || @ Mariners || 5–6  || Montero (4–2) || Feyereisen (3–3) || — || 14,772 || 43–29 || L5
|-style="background:#fbb;"
| 73 || June 20 || @ Mariners || 2–6  || Montero (5–2) || Castillo (2–4) || — || 18,172 || 43–30 || L6
|-style="background:#fbb;"
| 74 || June 22 || Red Sox || 5–9  || Hernández (2–2) || Fairbanks (1–3) || — || 12,994 || 43–31 || L7
|-style="background:#bfb;"
| 75 || June 23 || Red Sox || 8–2 || Hill (6–2) || Richards (4–5) || — || 9,088 || 44–31 || W1
|-style="background:#bfb;"
| 76 || June 24 || Red Sox || 1–0 || Feyereisen (4–3) || Barnes (3–2) || — || 10,961 || 45–31 || W2
|-style="background:#bfb;"
| 77 || June 25 || Angels || 4–3 || McHugh (2–1) || Suárez (2–1) || Castillo (12) || 7,909 || 46–31 || W3
|-style="background:#bfb;"
| 78 || June 26 || Angels || 13–3 || McClanahan (3–2) || Cobb (5–3) || — || 16,699 || 47–31 || W4
|-style="background:#fbb;"
| 79 || June 27 || Angels || 4–6 || Watson (3–3) || Wisler (1–3) || Iglesias (13) || 12,764 || 47–32 || L1
|-style="background:#fbb;"
| 80 || June 29 || @ Nationals || 3–4 || Ross (5–7) || Hill (6–3) || Hand (18) || 17,117 || 47–33 || L2
|-style="background:#fbb;"
| 81 || June 30 || @ Nationals || 6–15 || Lester (2–3) || Sherriff (0–1) || — || 15,552 || 47–34 || L3
|-

|-style="background:#fbb;"
| 82 || July 2 || @ Blue Jays || 1–11 || Manoah (2–0) || Patiño (1–2) || — || 10,011 || 47–35 || L4
|-style="background:#fbb;"
| 83 || July 3 || @ Blue Jays || 3–6 || Cimber (2–2) || McClanahan (3–3) || — || 9,189 || 47–36 || L5
|-style="background:#bfb;"
| 84 || July 4 || @ Blue Jays || 5–1 || Yarbrough (5–3) || Ray (6–4) || — || 7,537 || 48–36 || W1
|-style="background:#bfb;"
| 85 || July 5 || Indians || 9–8 || Fairbanks (2–3) || Clase (3–4) || — || 8,832 || 49–36 || W2
|-style="background:#bbb;" 
| — || July 6 || Indians || colspan=7 | Postponed (Tropical Storm Elsa) make-up date July 7
|-style="background:#bfb;"
| 86 || July 7  || Indians || 8–1  || Wacha (2–2) || Mejía (1–4) || — || N/A || 50–36 || W3
|-style="background:#bfb;"
| 87 || July 7  || Indians || 4–0  || Fleming (7–4) || Hentges (1–4) || — || 10,905 || 51–36 || W4
|-style="background:#bfb;"
| 88 || July 9 || Blue Jays || 7–1 || Kittredge (6–1) || Manoah (2–1) || — || 8,551 || 52–36 || W5
|-style="background:#bfb;"
| 89 || July 10 || Blue Jays || 5–2 || Yarbrough (6–3) || Stripling (3–5) || Castillo (13) || 9,954 || 53–36 || W6 
|-style="background:#fbb;"
| 90 || July 11 || Blue Jays || 1–3 || Ray (7–4) || Hill (6–4) || Romano (7) || 11,233 || 53–37 || L1
|- style="text-align:center; background:#bbcaff;"
| colspan="10" | 91st All-Star Game in Denver
|-style="background:#bfb;"
| 91 || July 16 || @ Braves || 7–6  || Wisler (2–3) || Chavez (0–2) || Fairbanks (4) || 40,485 || 54–37 || W1
|-style="background:#fbb;"
| 92 || July 17 || @ Braves || 0–9 || Fried (7–5) || Fleming (7–5) || — || 40,868 || 54–38 || L1
|-style="background:#bfb;"
| 93 || July 18 || @ Braves || 7–5 || Springs (5–1) || Minter (1–4) || Fairbanks (5) || 34,544 || 55–38 || W1
|-style="background:#fbb;"
| 94 || July 19 || Orioles || 1–6 || Watkins (2–0) || Yarbrough (6–4) || — || 9,922 || 55–39 || L1
|-style="background:#bfb;"
| 95 || July 20 || Orioles || 9–3 || McClanahan (4–3) || Means (4–3) || — || 10,399 || 56–39 || W1
|-style="background:#bfb;"
| 96 || July 21 || Orioles || 5–4 || McHugh (3–1) || Scott (3–4) || — || 8,968 || 57–39 || W2
|-style="background:#bfb;"
| 97 || July 22 || @ Indians || 5–4  || Fairbanks (3–3) || Shaw (3–4) || Castillo (14) || 19,338 || 58–39 || W3
|-style="background:#bfb;"
| 98 || July 23 || @ Indians || 10–5 || Wisler (3–3) || Wittgren (2–3) || — || 23,180 || 59–39 || W4
|-style="background:#bfb;"
| 99 || July 24 || @ Indians || 8–2 || Head (1–0) || Mejía (1–6) || — || 23,324 || 60–39 || W5
|-style="background:#fbb;"
| 100 || July 25 || @ Indians || 2–3 || Karinchak (7–2) || Wisler (3–4) || Clase (12) || 18,614 || 60–40 || L1
|-style="background:#fbb;"
| 101 || July 27 || Yankees || 3–4 || Montgomery (4–5) || McClanahan (4–4) || Chapman (19) || 12,678 || 60–41 || L2
|-style="background:#fbb;"
| 102 || July 28 || Yankees || 1–3  || Green (4–5) || Fairbanks (3–4) || Chapman (20) || 11,525 || 60–42 || L3
|-style="background:#bfb;"
| 103 || July 29 || Yankees || 14–0 || Patiño (2–2) || Cole (10–6) || — || 14,134 || 61–42 || W1
|-style="background:#bfb;"
| 104 || July 30 || Red Sox || 7–3 || Fleming (8–5) || Pérez (7–7) || — || 11,109 || 62–42 || W2
|-style="background:#bfb;"
| 105 || July 31 || Red Sox || 9–5 || Kittredge (7–1) || Eovaldi (9–6) || — || 20,521 || 63–42 || W3
|-

|-style="background:#bfb;"
| 106 || August 1 || Red Sox || 3–2 || McClanahan (5–4) || Pivetta (8–5) || Wisler (1) || 17,816 || 64–42 || W4
|-style="background:#fbb;"
| 107 || August 2 || Mariners || 2–8 || Flexen (10–5) || Wacha (2–3) || — || 5,855 || 64–43 || L1
|-style="background:#fbb;"
| 108 || August 3 || Mariners || 2–4 || Kikuchi (7–6) || Patiño (2–3) || Castillo (15) || 10,071 || 64–44 || L2
|-style="background:#bfb;"
| 109 || August 4 || Mariners || 4–3 || Fleming (9–5) || Gilbert (5–3) || Sherriff (1) || 9,701 || 65–44 || W1
|-style="background:#bfb;"
| 110 || August 6 || @ Orioles || 10–6 || Rasmussen (1–1) || Fry (4–4) || — || 11,320 || 66–44 || W2
|-style="background:#bfb;"
| 111 || August 7 || @ Orioles || 12–3 || McClanahan (6–4) || Watkins (2–3) || — || 18,545 || 67–44 || W3
|-style="background:#bfb;"
| 112 || August 8 || @ Orioles || 9–6 || Chargois (2–0) || Fry (4–5) || — || 10,576 || 68–44 || W4
|-style="background:#bfb;"
| 113 || August 10 || @ Red Sox || 8–4 || Kittredge (8–1) || Barnes (6–5) || — || 25,356 || 69–44 || W5
|-style="background:#fbb;"
| 114 || August 11 || @ Red Sox || 8–20 || Eovaldi (10–7) || Fleming (9–6) || — || 30,286 || 69–45 || L1
|-style="background:#bfb;"
| 115 || August 12 || @ Red Sox || 8–1 || McHugh (4–1) || Houck (0–3) || — || 26,803 || 70–45 || W1
|-style="background:#bfb;"
| 116 || August 13 || @ Twins || 10–4 || McClanahan (7–4) || Pineda (4–8) || Phillips (1) || 23,125 || 71–45 || W2
|-style="background:#fbb;"
| 117 || August 14 || @ Twins || 0–12 || Maeda (6–4) || Wacha (2–4) || — || 21,034 || 71–46 || L1 
|-style="background:#fbb;"
| 118 || August 15 || @ Twins || 4–5 || Colomé (3–4) || Wisler (3–5) || — || 22,467 || 71–47 || L2 
|-style="background:#bfb;"
| 119 || August 16 || Orioles || 9–2 || Fleming (10–6) || Harvey (6–12) || — || 5,460 || 72–47 || W1
|-style="background:#bfb;"
| 120 || August 17 || Orioles || 10–0 || Ellis (1–0) || Means (5–5) || — || 4,795 || 73–47 || W2
|-style="background:#bfb;"
| 121 || August 18 || Orioles || 8–4 || Yarbrough (7–4) || Watkins (2–5) || — || 6,673 || 74–47 || W3
|-style="background:#bfb;"
| 122 || August 19 || Orioles || 7–2 || McClanahan (8–4) || López (3–14) || — || 5,826 || 75–47 || W4
|-style="background:#fbb;"
| 123 || August 20 || White Sox || 5–7  || Hendriks (8–3) || Kittredge (8–2) || Tepera (2) || 13,178 || 75–48 || L1
|-style="background:#bfb;"
| 124 || August 21 || White Sox || 8–4 || Patiño (3–3) || Keuchel (8–7) || McHugh (1) || 22,275 || 76–48 || W1
|-style="background:#bfb;"
| 125 || August 22 || White Sox || 9–0 || Armstrong (1–0) || López (2–1) || Fleming (1)  || 16,696 || 77–48 || W2
|-style="background:#bfb;"
| 126 || August 24 || @ Phillies || 3–1 || Chargois (3–0) || Bradley (7–2) || Kittredge (3) || 23,402 || 78–48 || W3
|-style="background:#bfb;"
| 127 || August 25 || @ Phillies || 7–4 || McHugh (5–1) || Wheeler (10–9) || — || 25,552 || 79–48 || W4
|-style="background:#bfb;"
| 128 || August 27 || @ Orioles || 6–3 || McClanahan (9–4) || Harvey (6–14) || Mazza (1) || 7,155 || 80–48 || W5
|-style="background:#bfb;"
| 129 || August 28 || @ Orioles || 4–3 || Chargois (4–0) || Sulser (3–3) || Kittredge (4) || 11,110 || 81–48 || W6
|-style="background:#bfb;"
| 130 || August 29 || @ Orioles || 12–8 || Chargois (5–0) || Watkins (2–7) || — || 8,353 || 82–48 || W7
|-style="background:#bfb;"
| 131 || August 30 || Red Sox || 6–1 || Patiño (4–3) || Pivetta (9–7) || — || 6,753 || 83–48 || W8
|-style="background:#bfb;"
| 132 || August 31 || Red Sox || 8–5 || Yarbrough (8–4) || Peacock (0–1) || Kittredge (5) || 6,868 || 84–48 || W9
|-

|-style="background:#fbb;"
| 133 || September 1 || Red Sox || 2–3 || Whitlock (7–2) || Fairbanks (3–5) || Ottavino (11) || 7,808 || 84–49 || L1
|-style="background:#fbb;"
| 134 || September 2 || Red Sox || 0–4 || Rodríguez (11–7) || McClanahan (9–5) || Richards (2) || 7,923 || 84–50 || L2
|-style="background:#bfb;"
| 135 || September 3 || Twins || 5–3 || Wacha (3–4) || Dobnak (1–7) || Kittredge (6) || 8,864 || 85–50 || W1
|-style="background:#bfb;"
| 136 || September 4 || Twins || 11–4 || Archer (1–1) || Albers (1–1) || Enns (1) || 13,861 || 86–50 || W2
|-style="background:#fbb;"
| 137 || September 5 || Twins || 5–6 || Duffey (3–3) || Kittredge (8–3) || Colomé (11) || 14,165 || 86–51 || L1
|-style="background:#bfb;"
| 138 || September 6 || @ Red Sox || 11–10  || McHugh (6–1) || Whitlock (7–3) || — || 26,512 || 87–51 || W1
|-style="background:#bfb;"
| 139 || September 7 || @ Red Sox || 12–7 || Rasmussen (2–1) || Rodríguez (11–8) || — || 25,065 || 88–51 || W2
|-style="background:#fbb;"
| 140 || September 8 || @ Red Sox || 1–2 || Richards (7–7) || Chargois (5–1) || Robles (12) || 26,649 || 88–52 || L1
|-style="background:#fbb;"
| 141 || September 10 || @ Tigers || 4–10 || Cisnero (4–4) || Fairbanks (3–6) || — || 18,321 || 88–53 || L2
|-style="background:#bfb;"
| 142 || September 11 || @ Tigers || 7–2 || Enns (1–0) || Mize (7–8) || — || 18,842 || 89–53 || W1
|-style="background:#fbb;"
| 143 || September 12 || @ Tigers || 7–8  || Funkhouser (7–3) || Feyereisen (4–4) || — || 13,396 || 89–54 || L1
|-style="background:#fbb;"
| 144 || September 13 || @ Blue Jays || 1–8 || Manoah (6–2) || Yarbrough (8–5) || — || 12,119 || 89–55 || L2
|-style="background:#bfb;"
| 145 || September 14 || @ Blue Jays || 2–0 || Rasmussen (3–1) || Berríos (11–8) || Kittredge (7) || 13,103 || 90–55 || W1
|-style="background:#fbb;"
| 146 || September 15 || @ Blue Jays || 3–6 || Ray (12–5) || Wacha (3–5) || Romano (18) || 12,153 || 90–56 || L1
|-style="background:#bfb;"
| 147 || September 16 || Tigers || 5–2 || Enns (2–0) || Alexander (2–3) || — || 10,206 || 91–56 || W1
|-style="background:#bfb;"
| 148 || September 17 || Tigers || 7–4  || Kittredge (9–3) || Garcia (2–2) || — || 16,451 || 92–56 || W2
|-style="background:#fbb;"
| 149 || September 18 || Tigers || 3–4 || Ureña (4–8) || Yarbrough (8–6) || Fulmer (10) || 22,921 || 92–57 || L1
|-style="background:#fbb;"
| 150 || September 19 || Tigers || 0–2 || Peralta (4–3) || McClanahan (9–6) || Funkhouser (1) || 17,948 || 92–58 || L2
|-style="background:#bfb;"
| 151 || September 20 || Blue Jays || 6–4 || Baz (1–0) || Ray (12–6) || Enns (2) || 10,119 || 93–58 || W1
|-style="background:#fbb;"
| 152 || September 21 || Blue Jays || 2–4 || Manoah (7–2) || Anderson (0–1) || Romano (20) || 9,888 || 93–59 || L1
|-style="background:#bfb;"
| 153 || September 22 || Blue Jays || 7–1 || Chargois (6–1) || Stripling (5–7) || — || 10,994 || 94–59 || W1
|-style="background:#bfb;"
| 154 || September 24 || Marlins || 8–0 || Yarbrough (9–6) || Cabrera (0–3) || — || 15,340 || 95–59 || W2
|-style="background:#bfb;"
| 155 || September 25 || Marlins || 7–3 || McClanahan (10–6) || Alcántara (9–14) || — || 23,783 || 96–59 || W3
|-style="background:#bfb;"
| 156 || September 26 || Marlins || 3–2 || Baz (2–0) || Luzardo (5–9) || Anderson (1) || 20,826 || 97–59 || W4
|-style="background:#fbb;"
| 157 || September 28 || @ Astros || 3–4 || Maton (5–0) || Fleming (10–7) || — || 32,297 || 97–60 || L1
|-style="background:#bfb;"
| 158 || September 29 || @ Astros || 7–0 || Rasmussen (4–1) || García (11–8) || — || 28,321 || 98–60 || W1
|-style="background:#fbb;"
| 159 || September 30 || @ Astros || 2–3 || McCullers Jr. (13–5) || Yarbrough (9–7) || Pressly (26) || 31,608 || 98–61 || L1
|-

|-style="background:#bfb;"
| 160 || October 1 || @ Yankees || 4–3 || Head (2–0) || Cortés Jr. (2–3) || Kittredge (8) || 41,469 || 99–61 || W1
|-style="background:#bfb;"
| 161 || October 2 || @ Yankees || 12–2 || Patiño (5–3) || Montgomery (6–7) || — || 41,648 || 100–61 || W2
|-style="background:#fbb;"
| 162 || October 3 || @ Yankees || 0–1 || Chapman (6–4) || Fleming (10–8) || — || 40,409 || 100–62 || L1
|-

 Games played at TD Ballpark in Dunedin, Florida.
 Games played at Sahlen Field in Buffalo, New York.

Postseason 

|- style="background:#bfb;"
| 1 || October 7 || Red Sox || 5–0 || McClanahan (1–0) || Rodríguez (0–1) || — || Tropicana Field27,419 || 1–0
|- style="background:#fbb;"
| 2 || October 8 || Red Sox || 6−14 || Houck (1−0) || McHugh (0−1) || — || Tropicana Field37,616 || 1–1
|- style="background:#fbb;"
| 3 || October 10 || @ Red Sox || 4–6  || Pivetta (1–0) || Patiño (0–1) || — || Fenway Park37,224 || 1–2
|- style="background:#fbb;"
| 4 || October 11 || @ Red Sox || 5–6 || Whitlock (1–0) || Feyereisen (0–1) || — || Fenway Park38,447 || 1–3 
|-

Postseason rosters

| style="text-align:left" |
Pitchers: 11 Shane Baz 19 Josh Fleming 29 Pete Fairbanks 30 David Robertson 31 Collin McHugh 34 J. P. Feyereisen 36 Andrew Kittredge 37 Matt Wisler 52 Michael Wacha 57 Drew Rasmussen 61 Luis Patiño 62 Shane McClanahan 84 J. T. Chargois 
Catchers: 10 Mike Zunino 28 Francisco Mejía 
Infielders: 2 Yandy Díaz 5 Wander Franco 8 Brandon Lowe 18 Joey Wendle 26 Ji-man Choi 
Outfielders: 13 Manuel Margot 17 Austin Meadows 25 Jordan Luplow 39 Kevin Kiermaier 56 Randy Arozarena 
Designated hitters: 23 Nelson Cruz
|- valign="top"

Roster

Farm system

References

External links
Tampa Bay Rays 2021 Schedule at MLB.com
2021 Tampa Bay Rays season at ESPN
2021 Tampa Bay Rays season at Baseball Reference''

Tampa Bay Rays season
Tampa Bay Rays
Tampa Bay Rays seasons
American League East champion seasons